N. C. Downs House is a historic house located along Road 141 in Kenton, Kent County, Delaware.

Description and history 
The house was built around 1820, and is a two-story, three-bay, brick dwelling. It has a gable roof and corbelled brick cornice. It has a -story, three-bay, wood-framed wing on the west gable end and a small one-story wing attached. The facade is laid in Flemish bond, while the other three walls are done in seven-course common bond.

It was listed on the National Register of Historic Places on June 27, 1983.

References

Houses on the National Register of Historic Places in Delaware
Houses completed in 1820
Houses in Kent County, Delaware
Kenton, Delaware
National Register of Historic Places in Kent County, Delaware